A mail pouch or mailpouch is a container for mail, designed to transport first-class, registered mail, domestic mail and military mail. It usually has a drawstring, and is made of a stronger material (e.g., canvas) than mail sacks (e.g., plastic) and is designed to lock at the top with a mechanism system consisting of special closely spaced eyelets and a strong strap to secure the top where access into the bag is closed off and locked, where a mail sack does not have these features.

U.S. Postal Service

First-class mail 
In U.S. Postal Service (USPS) usage, first-class mail that would be carried in a mail pouch is mail sealed against postal inspection. An example of first-class mail is a typed letter or one written by hand. It must weigh less than 13 ounces.

Registered mail
Registered mail that would be carried in a mail pouch is mail that is within a certain length and width, regardless of thickness. Registered mail can be insured up to $25,000 for a certain premium fee. There is no limit on the value of an item sent in by registered mail. Registered mail is closely guarded and given maximum security like in handling with a locked mail pouch.

Military mail 
Military mail that would be carried in a mail pouch is mail ultimately handled by the Military Postal Service (MPS), which is an extension of the United States Postal Service. Many times it is mail provided outside of the contiguous United States.

Domestic mail 

Domestic mail that would be carried in a mail pouch is mail that would be ultimately delivered to United States territories and possessions (e.g., Army Post Offices (APOs), fleet Post Offices (FPOs), and the United Nations, NY). The United States Postal Service defines "territories and possessions" in its Domestic Mail Manual (DMM) as being American Samoa, Manua Island, Swains Island, Tutuila Island, Guam, Northern Mariana Islands, Commonwealth of the Rota Island, Saipan Island, Tinian Island, Puerto Rico, U.S. Virgin Islands, St. Croix Island, St. John Island, St. Thomas Island, Wake Atoll, and Wake Island. Mail originating in the United States and going to or coming from the Freely Associated States is treated as domestic mail. These are the Marshall Islands, Ebeye Island, Kwajalein Island, Micronesia, Kosrae Island, Pohnpei Island, Yap Island, Palau, and Koror Island.

Diplomatic pouches
Diplomatic pouches are outside the control of the U.S. Mail.  Thus, once a package is delivered to the U.S. State Department for inclusion in a Diplomatic pouch, the Postal Service considers it to have been delivered to the addressee, who then has the risks and responsibilities for its care and contents.

U.S. traveling postal service

Closed-pouch and express-pouch service 

According to a 1903 U.S. government report there was also a closed-pouch and express-pouch service associated with the U.S. traveling mail service. The report says that the number of clerks traveling in cars and boats was 10,555 and they traveled 235,114,604 miles. When added the closed-pouch and express-pouch service, the total number of miles traveled by clerks was 344,892,127.

Through-registered pouches 
"Through-registered pouches" are used in "through-registered service" of registered mail between post offices where hand-to-hand receipts can be obtained through the entire mail route of a Railway Post Office. 
Only certain Post Offices are designated "through-registered-pouch-offices". These pouches handle registered mail and have locked inner sacks within them.

"Through-registered pouches" were not only made of canvas, but had several thick staples at the top where a long leather strap passed through and locked for extra security. These pouches that transported registered mail between large cities were made with leather bottoms for extra strength.

Other mail pouch systems

Private mailbag 

Some countries use a so-called Private Mail Bag (also known as a "locked bag") which addresses a worldwide need for specialized mail delivery to single location, and are used for delivery to particular customers, such as corporations or governmental agencies. This is in lieu of a Post Office Box. Some locked bag customers have individualized corporate postal codes.  Like PO Box addresses, Private Mail Bag addresses omit the name of the building and street, and include only the number allocated to the user.  Private Mail Bag addresses are often used in countries in Africa where there may be no street delivery service. In Europe and North America, where street delivery is more commonplace, large users may be allocated their own postal codes, and consequently need only use their physical address in correspondence; the postal code implies that the recipient receives mail by caller service. See M-bags, also called "Direct Sacks", which are large bags used for surface based shipment of large or heavy items to a single address.

Mailbags are considered to be part of the postal system and are protected by law; interference with them can be the subject of criminal prosecution.

Mail pouches in popular culture
The form of the bag inspired the form and container of the West Virginia Mail Pouch Tobacco, which was featured on the ubiquitous Mail Pouch Tobacco Barn. This barn advertisement was created for the Block Brothers Tobacco Company. About 20,000 Mail Pouch barns spread across 22 states in the 1960s.

See also 

 Catcher pouch
 Diplomatic bag
 Mail bag
 Mail sack
 Mail satchel
 Military mail
 Mochila
 Owney (dog)
 Portmanteau

Bibliography

Footnotes

References

Sources

Further reading

External links 

 Mail pouch description at the Smithsonian National Postal Museum.

Bags
Philatelic terminology
Postal history
Postal services
Postal systems
United States Postal Service